The 2018 Supertaça Cândido de Oliveira was the 40th edition of the Supertaça Cândido de Oliveira. It was played on 4 August 2018 at the Estádio Municipal de Aveiro between the winners of the 2017–18 Primeira Liga, Porto, and the winners of the 2017–18 Taça de Portugal, Desportivo das Aves. Porto won 3–1 and to secure their first Supertaça title since 2013 and extend their record to 21 titles overall.

Venue
The Estádio Municipal de Aveiro was announced as the venue for both the 2017 and 2018 editions of Supertaça Cândido de Oliveira on 6 June 2017, following the decision of the Portuguese Football Federation Directive Board. This was the ninth time that this stadium hosted the Supertaça Cândido de Oliveira, after 2009, 2010, 2011, 2012, 2013, 2014, 2016 and 2017.

Background

Pre-match

Entry

Broadcasting

Officials

Ticketing

Venue

Match

Details

References

Supertaça Cândido de Oliveira
FC Porto matches
C.D. Aves matches
2018–19 in Portuguese football
August 2018 sports events in Europe